The 2016 United States presidential election in Maine was held on Tuesday, November 8, 2016, as part of the 2016 United States presidential election in which all 50 states plus the District of Columbia participated. Maine voters chose electors to represent them in the Electoral College via a popular vote, pitting the Republican Party's nominee, businessman Donald Trump, and running mate Indiana Governor Mike Pence against Democratic Party nominee, former Secretary of State Hillary Clinton, and her running mate Virginia Senator Tim Kaine. Maine has four electoral votes in the Electoral College. Unlike all other states except Nebraska, Maine awards two electoral votes based on the statewide vote, and one vote for each congressional district. The last time it did so was in 1828.

On election day, Clinton carried Maine's two at-large electoral votes with a plurality and won Maine's 1st congressional district, while Trump won Maine's 2nd congressional district, making him the first Republican to do so since George H. W. Bush in 1988 and also making him the first Republican to win an electoral vote from a New England state since George W. Bush won New Hampshire in 2000.

Maine was once one of the most Republican states in the nation. It voted for the Democratic ticket only three times (1912, 1964, and 1968) from 1856 to 1988, but a Democrat has won the state's popular vote in every election since then. Although regarded as a safe blue state, Maine shifted dramatically and unexpectedly towards the Republicans, with Clinton's 2.96% margin of victory the narrowest for a Democrat since 1988, when Republicans last won the state, and well down on Obama's 15.29% margin in 2012. As a measure of how Republican Maine once was at the presidential level, Trump is only the third Republican to win the White House without winning the popular vote in Maine after Richard Nixon in 1968 and George W. Bush in both his 2000 and 2004 campaigns.

In addition to the historic electoral vote split in Maine, this marked the first time that such a split occurred after Maine began awarding electoral votes based on congressional districts in 1972. This was also the second time that a state split its Electoral College vote by congressional district since Nebraska in 2008.

Caucuses

Democratic caucuses

Bernie Sanders swept all of Maine's counties and also won a large share of the democratic caucus votes in New England.

Republican caucuses

Ted Cruz, Marco Rubio, Donald Trump, and John Kasich were all on the ballot for the 2016 Maine state Republican caucuses. The caucuses were held on March 5, 2016, in the following counties in Maine: Cumberland, Franklin, Piscataquis, Somerset, Aroostook, Androscoggin, Sagadahoc, Kennebec, Lincoln, Knox, Hancock, Waldo, Washington, York, Oxford, and Penobscot.

Ted Cruz won the caucus with 45.9% of the vote and was awarded 12 delegates, with Donald Trump in second, receiving 32.59% of the votes and 9 delegates.

Delegates were awarded to candidates who got 10% or more of the vote proportionally.

Green caucuses
Maine held a series of caucuses throughout the state between February 27 and March 19. The Maine Green Independent Party didn't compile the results until the state convention on May 7, during which it then assigned delegates based on the results.

On March 13, 2016, it was announced that Jill Stein had won the Maine Green Independent Party caucuses.

Libertarian convention
The Libertarian Party nominated its ticket, former New Mexico Governor Gary Johnson for president and former Massachusetts Governor William Weld for vice president, at its national convention in Orlando, Florida, on May 29, 2016.

Until July 13, 2016, the Libertarian Party was not a legally recognized party in Maine.  A 2013 change in the ballot access law permitted a party to gain recognition if they enroll 5,000 Maine voters in the party. The Libertarian Party of Maine turned approximately 6,500 signatures in to the Maine Secretary of State's office in 2015, but Secretary of State Matthew Dunlap invalidated 2,000 of them, bringing the total below the threshold required. The party then sued Dunlap, claiming Maine's ballot access requirements were unconstitutionally unreasonable.  While losing an initial ruling by U.S. District Court Judge John Woodcock, Woodcock later ordered that they be given until July 12 to collect the necessary signatures. On July 13, Dunlap certified that 5,150 signatures had been validated, surpassing the threshold required to allow their candidates on the ballot.  Maintenance of the status required obtaining 10,000 presidential votes in the general election.

General election
Maine distributes 2 EVs based on the statewide vote and 1 EV for each congressional district's vote.

Predictions

Polling

Statewide, Hillary Clinton won every pre-election poll but one with margins ranging from 3 to 11 points. The average of the last two polls showed Hillary Clinton ahead of Donald Trump 46.5% to 41% statewide.

Statewide Polls

Four-way race

1st congressional district
Hillary Clinton won every poll in the 1st Congressional District. The average of the last three polls had her leading 49% to 36%.

2nd congressional district
Donald Trump won most of the polls conducted in Maine's 2nd district. He was ahead anywhere from 3 to 11 points, although Hillary Clinton won the last poll 44% to 42%. An average of the last two polls showed Trump leading Hillary Clinton 41.5% to 41%.

Polls

Four-way race

Statewide results

County results

Counties that flipped from Democratic to Republican

 Androscoggin (largest city: Lewiston)
 Aroostook (largest city: Presque Isle)
 Franklin (largest town: Farmington)
 Kennebec (largest city: Augusta)
 Oxford (largest town: Rumford)
 Penobscot (largest city: Bangor)
 Somerset (largest town: Skowhegan)
 Washington (largest city: Calais)

Congressional district
Clinton took the southern 1st district while Trump carried the more rural 2nd district.

See also
 United States presidential elections in Maine
 2016 Democratic Party presidential debates and forums
 2016 Democratic Party presidential primaries
 2016 Republican Party presidential debates and forums
 2016 Republican Party presidential primaries

Notes

References

External links
 RNC 2016 Republican Nominating Process 
 Green papers for 2016 primaries, caucuses, and conventions
 Decision Desk Headquarter Results for Maine
 State of Maine – Bureau of Corporations, Elections & Commissions – Elections & Voting – Election Results

Maine
2016
Presidential